The 2007 CAF Confederation Cup was the fourth edition of the CAF Confederation Cup. Its schedule began with the preliminary round (home-and-away ties) in late January and mid-February with the second round in March and the third round in April.

Qualifying rounds

All rounds have been drawn.

Preliminary round
1st legs played 26–28 January 2007 and 2nd legs played 9–11 February 2007.

|}
1 The tie was played over one leg by mutual consent due to civil unrest in Guinea.

First round
1st legs played 2–4 March 2007 and 2nd legs played 16–18 March 2007.

|}

1 Tema Youth were disqualified for not showing up to the first leg.

Second round
1st legs played 6–8 April 2007 and 2nd legs played 20–22 April 2007.

|}
1 Benfica de Luanda were ejected from the competition for fielding an ineligible player.

Play-off round
The 8 winners of the round of 16 play the losers of the round of 16 of the Champions League for 8 places in the group stage.
1st legs played 4–6 May 2007 and 2nd legs played 18–20 May 2007.

|}

Group stage

The Group Stage matches were played between August and October 2007.

Group B

Knockout stage

Final

CS Sfaxien won 5–2 on aggregate.

Top goalscorers

The top scorers from the 2007 CAF Confederation Cup are as follows:

External links
Official Site
Confederation Cup 2007 - rsssf.com
Details of group matches - goalzz.com

 
CAF Confederation Cup
2007 in African football